Luis Antonio Delgado Tapia (born August 19, 1990) is a professional Mexican footballer who most recently played for Correcaminos UAT on loan from León.

External links

1990 births
Living people
Mexican footballers
Association football defenders
Club León footballers
Mineros de Zacatecas players
Correcaminos UAT footballers
Liga MX players
Ascenso MX players
Liga Premier de México players
Tercera División de México players
Footballers from Guanajuato
Sportspeople from León, Guanajuato